The Hands of Orlac (German: Orlacs Hände) is a 1924 Austrian silent horror film directed by Robert Wiene and starring Conrad Veidt, Alexandra Sorina and Fritz Kortner. It is based on the novel Les Mains d'Orlac by Maurice Renard.

Plot
Concert pianist Paul Orlac loses his hands in a horrible railway accident. His wife Yvonne pleads with a surgeon to try and save Orlac's hands.  The surgeon transplants the hands of a recently executed murderer named Vasseur.  When Orlac learns this, horror obsesses him.  He is tortured by the presence of a knife he finds at his house, just like that used by Vasseur, and the desire to kill. He believes that along with the hands he has acquired the murderer's predisposition to violence. He confronts the surgeon, telling him to remove the hands, but the surgeon tries to convince him that a person's acts are not governed by hands, but by the head and heart.

Orlac's new hands are unable to play the piano, and in time he and his wife run out of money.  Creditors give them one more day to pay their bills.  Yvonne goes to Paul's father for money, but is refused.  Orlac himself then goes to see his father, but finds he has been stabbed to death with the same knife like Vasseur's. He starts to think he himself committed the murder, and goes to a café for a drink.  There he meets a man who claims he is Vasseur, who tells Orlac that the assistant of the surgeon who did the hand transplant reattached his - Vasseur's - head to his body.   He then tells Orlac he wants money to keep quiet about the murder.

In the meantime, police find Vasseur's finger prints at the scene of the crime, causing confusion.  Paul and Yvonne Orlac decide to go to the police and try to explain about Vasseur's hands being on Paul's arms, but that he had no recollection of killing his father.  He also tells the police about the man claiming to be the executed murderer, and the blackmail money.  It turns out that the man is actually a con man named Nera, well known to police.  Orlac's maid tells the police that Nera was a friend of Vasseur, and that he had made a set of rubber gloves with Vasseur's fingerprints.  The gloves were used during the murder, and she also states that Vassuer was innocent of the murder he was tried for, thereby making Orlac have the hands of an innocent rather than a murderer.

Cast
 Conrad Veidt as Paul Orlac
 Alexandra Sorina as Yvonne Orlac
 Fritz Kortner as Nera
 Carmen Cartellieri as Regine
 Hans Homma as Dr. Serra
 Fritz Strassny as Paul's father
 Paul Askonas as Servant

Production and release
The Hands of Orlac was produced by the Austrian Pan-Film company in association with the German distribution company Berolina Film and shot at the studios of Listo Film in Vienna. The sets were constructed by the film architects and set builders Stefan Wessely, Hans Rouc, and Karl Exner.

The film saw its premiere in Berlin, Germany, on 24 September 1924. The regular cinema release followed in early 1925, on 31 January in Berlin and on 6 March in Vienna. Distribution was carried out by Berolina Film. The French version had the title Les Mains d'Orlac, the English version The Hands of Orlac. The film was first shown in the United States in 1928, where its promotion and distribution were undertaken by the Aywon Film Corporation.

Reception

 On Rotten Tomatoes, the film has an approval rating 91% based on reviews from 11 critics, with an average rating of 7.8/10.
 Paimann's Filmlisten, Nr. 441, 1924, p. 181: "the presentation of the subject is extremely gripping and tension is maintained right up to the last scene: an extraordinarily well-chosen ensemble headed by Konrad Veidt makes the very most of the possibilities. The direction is taut and careful, especially in the very realistic scenes of the railway accident, the decor tasteful, the events of the action effectively emphasised. The photography is of the highest quality in every respect. An Austrian film that is the equal of the best foreign products."
 On its U.S. release in 1928, Variety wrote "Were it not for Veidt's masterly characterization, The Hands of Orlac would be an absurd fantasy in the old-time mystery-thriller class"; and The New York Times opined "Although it is raw, hardly the sort of thing some people want to look at after the evening demi-tasse or just before retiring. "The Hands of Orlacc," an old German production now at the Greenwich Village Theatre, is not without merit."
 Many academics have responded to the film, raising questions such as how the film interacts with issues of disability.

Versions

The original version was 2,507 metres long, the equivalent of 91 minutes at a frame rate of 24 fps or 110 minutes at 20 fps. The reconstructed version is 2,357 metres long, which corresponds to about 90 minutes. On 11 January 2001 ARTE broadcast a version reconstructed in 1995 by the Bundesarchiv-Filmarchiv in Berlin, Friedrich-Wilhelm-Murnau-Stiftung and the Deutsches Filminstitut with the cooperation of Jugoslovenska Kinoteka in Belgrad. This version had new music by Henning Lohner and was also given background noises and the sound effects of an interrogation scene off, which was not universally approved. Since then the film has been shown at many film festivals worldwide. Another version was released on DVD by Kino Lorber in 2008, based on the 1995 reconstruction and restored by Bret Wood with a score by composer Paul Mercer and additional footage courtesy of The Raymond Rohauer Collection in Columbus, Ohio. The Filmarchiv Austria has restored the film with material from its archives. It will premiere at Konzerthaus Wien on 13 June 2013 as part of the Vienna Music Festival, with a new score by American composer Donald Sosin, performed by the composer at the piano and Dennis James at the Rieger organ.

Censor's decisions

The film was approved for German release on 25 September 1924, but for adults only. An application was made by the Ministry of the Interior of Saxony dated 10 January 1925, urging that the film should be censored, because it "is likely to endanger public safety and order […] Based on an assessment by the Provincial Criminal Office at Dresden the Government of Saxony does not think it appropriate to make publicly known the internal arrangements and tools of the criminal police, particularly in connection with the taking of finger prints, as this would make the fighting of crime more difficult. Further, the representation of means which enable the criminal to obliterate his prints and deceive the police, is highly unsuitable."

The application for censorship was refused by the Higher Inspectorate, as an expert from the police headquarters in Berlin, when questioned by them about it, described the specialist content as unrealistic. There were so far no experiences across the whole of Europe of the falsification of finger prints by the use of wax impressions or similar techniques, leaving aside any other methods of falsifying prints. The Inspectorate did concede that if the film had shown a realistic method of forging fingerprints, if any existed, then it would have raised issues of public security, but concluded that what was shown in the film was pure fantasy.

In 1996, the film was re-evaluated and released; an age limit was retained.

See also
Renard's novel was also adapted as
 Mad Love (USA 1935, dir. Karl Freund) 
 The Hands of Orlac (GB/FR 1960, dir. Edmond T. Gréville)

Notes

References

Bibliography
 Jung, Uli & Schatzberg, Walter. Beyond Caligari: The Films of Robert Wiene. Berghahn Books, 1999.
 Roland M. Hahn und Rolf Giesen: Das neue Lexikon des Horrorfilms. Berlin: Lexikon Interprint Verlag, 2002. 
 Matthias Bickenbach, Annina Klappert, Hedwig Pompe: Manus Loquens. Medium der Geste - Geste der Medien. Dumont Literatur und Kunst Verlag, Cologne 2003, pp. 243–305: Monströse Moderne. Zur Funktionsstelle der manus loquens in Robert Wienes ORLACS HÄNDE (Österreich 1924)

External links
 
 
 
 
 Stummfilm.at 
 Arcor.de 
 Zelluloid.de 
   Película en línea en inglés y en español

1924 films
1924 horror films
1920s fantasy films
Austrian fantasy films
Austrian silent feature films
Austrian black-and-white films
Films based on French novels
Films based on horror novels
Films about pianos and pianists
Films directed by Robert Wiene
Films about organ transplantation
1920s science fiction horror films
Austrian science fiction horror films
Silent horror films